Giulio Regeni (15 January 1988 – 25 January 2016) was an Italian University of Cambridge graduate who was abducted and tortured to death in Egypt. Regeni was a PhD student at Girton College, Cambridge, researching Egypt's independent trade unions, and was also  a former employee of the international consulting firm Oxford Analytica. He grew up in Fiumicello, a former comune (now Fiumicello Villa Vicentina) in the province of Udine in northeastern Italy.

Discovery of the body 

Regeni's mutilated and half-naked corpse was found in a ditch alongside the Cairo-Alexandria highway on the outskirts of Cairo on 3 February 2016. His recovered body showed signs of extreme torture: contusions and abrasions all over from a severe beating; extensive bruising from kicks, punches, and assault with a stick; more than two dozen bone fractures, among them seven broken ribs, all fingers and toes, as well as legs, arms, and shoulder blades; multiple stab wounds on the body including the soles of the feet, possibly from an ice pick or awl-like instrument; numerous cuts over the entire body made with a sharp instrument suspected to be a razor; extensive cigarette burns; a larger burn mark between the shoulder blades made with a hard and hot object; a brain hemorrhage; and a broken cervical vertebra, which ultimately caused death.

Investigations 

Italian and Egyptian officials conducted separate autopsies on Regeni's corpse with an Egyptian forensic official reporting on 1 March 2016, that he was interrogated and tortured for up to seven days at intervals of 1014 hours before he was finally killed. The Egyptian autopsy findings have still not been made public. A 300-page report of the Italian autopsy findings has been handed over to the public prosecutor's office in Rome and denies earlier reports of signs of electric shocks administered to Regeni's genitals.

On 24 March 2016, Egyptian police killed four men in a shoot out, who were allegedly responsible for kidnapping Regeni. According to a Facebook post from the official page of the Ministry of the Interior, the gang specialized in kidnapping foreigners and stealing their money. In a raid on the flat of one of the gang members, the Egyptian police claim they found various items that belonged to Regeni including his passport and student photo IDs. However, witnesses told Declan Walsh and other journalists that the "gang" members had been executed, not shot while riding in the van: "One was shot as he ran, his corpse later positioned inside the van". Their link to Regeni was also suspect: "Italian investigators used phone records to show that the supposed gang leader, Tarek Abdel Fattah, was 60 miles north of Cairo the day he supposedly kidnapped Regeni", according to Declan Walsh. The New Cairo prosecutor's office later denied that the criminal gang was involved in his murder.

Regeni's passport and the other documents were handed over to Italian prosecutors on 1 November, same year, during a "positive" meeting in Cairo.

On 8 June 2016, Italian news agency ANSA reported that Regeni's tutors at Cambridge University had declined to collaborate with the inquest into his murder, to the disappointment of investigators and Regeni's family. This had been anticipated by coverage in the Italian weekly L'Espresso on 7 June 2016, which reported that Regeni's tutor Maha Abdelrahman had followed advice from University lawyers not to collaborate with the inquest. The University of Cambridge strongly rejected the claims in a statement released to Varsity, the Cambridge student newspaper. Despite commitment on behalf of Cambridge University, as of early December 2017, British authorities had denied requests by the Italian prosecutors concerning the interrogation of specific individuals in Britain; on a similar note, Abdelrahman had refused to speak to the Italian prosecutor. 
Such British inaction in the aftermath of the incident would be later described by Cambridge MP Daniel Zeichner as "lack of tenacity". Following the controversy that played out in the media, Abdelrahman eventually agreed to be questioned by Italian authorities and received praises from the Italian Minister of Foreign Affairs for having chosen to cooperate.

In November 2020, Italian magistrates concluded the investigation into Regeni's torture and murder, charging five Egyptian security officials as suspects in the case. The officials were set to face their trial in Italy. The investigation found that Regeni was tortured and murdered by the officials after his doctoral research led them to suspect him of being a spy.

In October 2021, the trial of the four Egyptian police officers opened in Rome in their absence. They are accused of being behind the murder of Giulio Regeni.

Accusations against Egyptian officials 

Due to Regeni's research activities and left-wing political leanings, the Egyptian police is strongly suspected of involvement in his murder in Egypt, although Egypt's media and government deny this, alleging secret undercover agents belonging to the Muslim Brotherhood in Egypt carried out the crime in order to embarrass the Egyptian government and destabilize relations between Italy and Egypt.

On 21 April 2016, Reuters reported three Egyptian intelligence officials and three police sources independently claiming Regeni was in police custody at some time before his death. According to these sources he was picked up by plainclothes police officers near Gamal Abdel Nasser metro station together with another Egyptian man on the evening of 25 January. Both men were then taken in a white minibus with police license plates to Izbakiya police station in downtown Cairo.

Shadowing foreigners was later dismissed by a Homeland Security official and the Interior Ministry as day-to-day work bearing no implications, and Egyptian general prosecutor Nabeel Sadek confirmed that Cairo police had received a report on Regeni on 7 January 2016, and that the Egyptian National Security Agency had been monitoring Regeni.

L'Espresso linked Egyptian President Abdel Fattah el-Sisi's son Mahmoud to Regeni's murder, stating that "It is hard to think that el-Sisi's son was not aware of Regeni's movements before he disappeared."

On 7 December 2016, a joint statement of Egyptian and Italian prosecutors, released following a two-day summit in Rome, stated that Egyptian prosecutors had questioned the policemen who investigated Regeni's death in January, as well as those who killed the four gang members in March.

On 15 August 2017, journalist Declan Walsh published in The New York Times the statement of an anonymous Obama administration official who revealed that, in the weeks after Regeni's death, the United States acquired "explosive proof that Egyptian security officials had abducted, tortured and killed Regeni" and that "Egypt's leadership was fully aware of the [death] circumstances".

Walsh writes that Italian investigators working in Egypt "were hindered at every turn. Witnesses appeared to have been coached. Surveillance footage from the subway station near Regeni’s apartment had been deleted; requests for metadata from millions of phone calls were refused on the grounds that it would compromise the constitutional rights of Egyptian citizens."

After the article, the Italian government denied that the Americans provided any actionable proof; AISE told the hint from the USA was of little benefit, since it came when the autopsy and investigation had already persuaded Italian investigators of Egypt's involvement, and Americans refused to reveal anything more specific, like names of involved people or institutions.

On 21 December 2017, the Italian investigators led by Giuseppe Pignatone flew to Cairo to meet the Egyptian prosecutor Nabel Sadek and his team. The Egyptian team submitted new reports, including the progress on the recovery of surveillance cameras footage. The Italians had carefully examined and cross linked all the evidence available to them until then, and provided a detailed explanation for the facts.

For the kidnapping, they reiterated and pinpointed the allegations against major Majdi Ibrahim Abdel-Al Sharif, captain Osan Helmy, and three other people of Egyptian National Security Agency. For the red herring, which included the killings on 24 March 2016, they blamed captain Mahmud Hendy and other people of the local police.

A witness spoke in May 2019 and said that he was in a cafe in Nairobi, the capital of Kenya, in August 2017, where he heard Egyptian officials discussing the "Italian guy" case. After spying on an exchange of business cards, he heard that the officer who claimed to have been personally involved in Regeni's kidnapping and death was, in fact, Major Majdi Ibrahim Abdel-Al Sharif, 35 years old. According to the eyewitness account, they believed Regeni was a British spy and that the officer said he had to hit and slap Regeni after loading him into the police van. The Italian investigators listened to the witness and credited his reconstruction of the events with some reliability. In fact, the Major was already among the suspects.

In December 2020, four agents of the Egyptian National Security Agency (NSA)— Major  Madgi Ibrahim Abdelal Sharif, Major General Tariq Sabir, Colonel Athar Kamel Mohamed Ibrahim and Colonel Uhsam Helmi — were charged by Italian prosecutors with the “aggravated kidnapping” of Regeni. Besides, Major Sharif was also charged with “conspiracy to commit aggravated murder”. In May 2021, an Italian judge, Pier Luigi Balestrieri ordered a trial, which was the ultimate resort for the Italian authorities, to begin in October 2021. It was ruled that they will be tried by the prosecutors in Italy on charges of torturing, kidnapping and murdering Regeni.

However, on 14 October 2021 the Third Court of Assizes of Rome invalidated the trial, stating that the three NSA agents had not been notified about their charges and that, therefore, the trial could not begin. The case, therefore, returned to the Judge of the Preliminary Hearing.

Reactions of the international community 

Regeni's torture and murder sparked global outrage, with more than 4,600 academics signing a petition calling for an investigation into his death and into the many disappearances that take place in Egypt each month, while on 24 February 2016, Amnesty International Italy launched a campaign called Verità per Giulio Regeni ("Truth for Giulio Regeni"). UK Parliament petition No. 120832 was created by Hannah Waddilove, a former colleague of Giulio Regeni's at Oxford Analytica, in February 2016. UK involvement was solicited on the rationale that freedom of thought, expression, and press are not meaningful if they cannot be backed by freedom of research. Hence active steps were expected from the UK in order to protect operations carried out by personnel belonging to its universities. The petition reached 10,000 signatures next April, the Parliament renewed their offer of assistance. An online petition was also started on Change.org that received more than 100,000 signatures.

On 10 March 2016, the European Parliament in Strasbourg passed a motion for a resolution condemning Regeni's torture and killing and the ongoing human rights abuses of the al-Sisi government in Egypt. The resolution was passed with an overwhelming majority.

In April 2016, Italy recalled its ambassador to Egypt due to a lack of co-operation, during the investigation, from the Egyptian authorities.  On 14 April, The New York Times, in an editorial, attacked France harshly, calling the silence in the face of Italy's requests to put pressure on Egypt "shameful".

In May 2016, Italian weekly magazine L'Espresso set up a secure platform based on GlobaLeaks technology to collect testimonials about torture and human rights abuse from Egyptian whistleblowers – and to seek justice for Regeni and for other murder victims in Egypt.

On 25 January 2017, the first anniversary of his disappearance, thousands of people gathered to remember Regeni in Rome, Milan, Fiumicello, and other Italian towns.

On 1 May 2017, Pope Francis said that the Vatican was taking steps to investigate the situation: "The Holy See has taken some steps. I will not say how or where, but we have taken some steps".

From 2016, al-Sisi had promised Regeni's parents his personal involvement to establish the truth on the murder of their son, but three years later, Paola and Claudio Regeni published a hard reply. "We cannot be satisfied by your condolences anymore, nor by your failed promises", they said.

See also 
 Majdi Ibrahim Abdel-Al Sharif
 Detention of Patrick Zaki
 Academic Freedom in the Middle East
 Ibrahim Metwaly
 List of solved missing persons cases
 List of unsolved murders

References

Bibliography

Filmography

External links 

 

2016 deaths
Deaths by person in Africa
Diplomatic incidents
Formerly missing people
Human rights abuses in Egypt
Italian torture victims
Male murder victims
Missing person cases in Egypt
Unsolved murders in Egypt
People educated at a United World College